Pope Township is one of twenty townships in Fayette County, Illinois, United States.  As of the 2010 census, its population was 213, and it contained 93 housing units.  It was formed from part of Kaskaskia Township in March 1878.

Geography

Cemeteries
The township contains these three cemeteries: Bear Creek, Magassi and Pratt.

Rivers
 Kaskaskia River

Lakes
 Wildcat Lake

Demographics

School districts
 Patoka Community Unit School District 100
 Vandalia Community Unit School District 203

Political districts
 Illinois' 19th congressional district
 State House District 107
 State Senate District 54

References
 
 United States Census Bureau 2007 TIGER/Line Shapefiles
 United States National Atlas

External links
 City-Data.com
 Illinois State Archives

Townships in Fayette County, Illinois
Populated places established in 1878
Townships in Illinois